Konstantin Kravchuk and Denys Molchanov successfully defended their title, defeating Karol Beck and Kamil Čapkovič 6–4, 6–3 in the final.

Seeds

Draw

Draw

References
 Main Draw

President's Cup (tennis)- Doubles
2012 Doubles